Michael Gordon Garner (born 3 October 1954 in Edmonton, London) is an English theatre and television actor who is best known for playing Leading Firefighter/Sub Officer Geoffrey "Poison" Pearce in London's Burning between 1993 and 2002.

Education
He was educated at Galliard Road Primary School, Edmonton and the King's School, Grantham. He gained a B.A. in Drama and English at Exeter University.

Theatre
 A Tale of Two Cities Northampton/National Tour
 Nell Gwynn Apollo Theatre West End
 Told Look Younger Jermyn St Theatre
 The Three Sisters (Southwark Playhouse)
 The Merry Wives of Windsor (Shakespeare's Globe)
 Michael Frayn’s Alphabetical Order at Hampstead Theatre
 A Small Family Business (Watford Palace Theatre)
 Art (National tour)
 An Evening with Gary Lineker (Duchess Theatre)
 Roots (National Theatre)
 Sleeping Nightie (Royal Court Theatre)
 The Caucasian Chalk Circle (Young Vic)
 Educating Rita (Palace Theatre, Westcliffe)
 Hamlet, (Oxford Playhouse and International Tour)
 Rosencrantz and Guildenstern are Dead and Cider with Rosie (Oxford Playhouse Company)
 Unsuitable for Adults, W.C.P.C. (Liverpool Playhouse)
 Abigail’s Party, Accidental Death of an Anarchist, Ram Alley (Contact Theatre, Manchester)
 Absent Friends (Wolsey Theatre, Ipswich)
 The Merchant of Venice, Night and Day, Not Quite Jerusalem (Leeds Playhouse)
 Gothic Horrors (Shared Experience)
 Also seasons at the Library Theatre, Manchester and the Crucible Theatre, Sheffield.

Television
 London's Burning (Nine series as Leading Firefighter/Sub Officer Geoffrey Pearce)
 Other series include Vital Signs, Thin Air, EastEnders, Playing for Real, Spender and Thacker.  Also Doc Martin, Holby City, Doctors, Down to Earth, Heartbeat, The Nation’s Health, Casualty, Brookside, Barriers, Struggle, Coronation Street, Minder, The Bill, Baby Talk, The Chief, Van der Valk, Earth Warp and Goodnight Sweetheart.

Film

Music
Appears in the Ellie Goulding video for "How Long Will I Love You?" as the man who she kisses in the car park while undertaking a series of pranks.

Personal life
Garner lives in London with his partner Paula Hamilton, and their two children. He has run the London Marathon six times for the Leukemia Research charity.

References

External links
 

1954 births
Living people
English male film actors
English male television actors
20th-century English male actors
21st-century English male actors
People from Edmonton, London
People educated at The King's School, Grantham
Alumni of the University of Exeter